Babljak may refer to:
 Babljak (Rogatica), Bosnia and Herzegovina
 Babljak, Kolašin, Montenegro